Alexandre François is a French linguist specialising in the description and study of the indigenous languages of Melanesia. He belongs to Lattice, a research centre of the CNRS and École Normale Supérieure dedicated to linguistics.

Research

Language description and documentation
François has done linguistic fieldwork in Vanuatu and the Solomon Islands. 

In 2002, he published a grammatical description of Araki, a language spoken by a handful of speakers on an islet south of Espiritu Santo (Vanuatu).

Most of his research focuses on the northern islands of Vanuatu, known as the Torres and Banks Islands, an area where sixteen out of seventeen languages are still spoken: Hiw, Lo-Toga, Lehali, Löyöp, Mwotlap, Volow (extinct), Lemerig, Vera'a, Vurës, Mwesen, Mota, Nume, Dorig, Koro, Olrat, Lakon, Mwerlap - all descended from the Proto-Torres–Banks language, which was also reconstructed by him. After describing Mwotlap, the language with most speakers in that area, he has published articles comparing the languages of the area more generally – both from a synchronic and historical perspectives. He has described the sociolinguistic profile of this area as one of "egalitarian multilingualism".

In 2005, François took part in a scientific expedition to Vanikoro (Solomon islands), whose objective was to understand the wreckage of the French navigator La Pérouse in 1788. As a member of a multidisciplinary team, he recorded the oral tradition of the Melanesian and Polynesian populations of this island, concerning popular representations of this historical event. On that occasion, he also documented the three languages spoken on Vanikoro – Teanu, Lovono and Tanema – two of which are highly endangered.

In 2015, he coauthored with Jean-Michel Charpentier the Linguistic Atlas of French Polynesia, an atlas showcasing the internal linguistic diversity of French Polynesia.

In 2020, he was elected a member of the Academia Europaea.

Documentation of languages and cultures in Melanesia
François recorded texts from the oral literature – myths, legends, folktales – in various language communities of Vanuatu and the Solomons.

He provided local communities with various books in their languages, in the perspective of promoting the use of vernacular languages in writing.

Together with ethnomusicologist Monika Stern and anthropologist Éric Wittersheim, he ran a multidisciplinary project on traditional music and poetry in Vanuatu. This led to the publication of Music of Vanuatu: Celebrations and Mysteries, a CD album of songs and dances recorded during social events in the field.

Contribution to linguistic typology and theory
François coined the term "colexification". This term captures the fact that certain concepts, which some languages distinguish in their lexicons, are encoded in the same way ("colexified") in other languages.  Colexification is increasingly used in research about lexical typology.

Together with Siva Kalyan (ANU), he also developed Historical glottometry, a non-cladistic approach to language genealogy, inspired by the Wave model.

Selected publications

 

 

 
 .
 
 
 .

Notes

External links
 A linguist in Melanesia, personal website.
 Professional page (Lattice-CNRS).
 Professional page (Linguistics, ANU).
 Access to François' fieldwork archives on 23 languages of Island Melanesia.

Living people
Year of birth missing (living people)
Linguists of Austronesian languages
Linguists of Oceanic languages
Linguists from France
Members of Academia Europaea
French National Centre for Scientific Research scientists